Lupus means "wolf" in Latin.  It was a Latin cognomen and since then has become both a given name and family name.

It may refer to:

 Cornelius Lupus, Roman statesman

Given name
 Lupus of Troyes (ca. 383 – ca. 478), French bishop and saint
 Lupus of Sens (d. 623), French bishop and saint
 Lupus I of Aquitaine, Duke of Gascony and Aquitaine from about 670
 Lupus II of Gascony (died 778), third-attested historical duke of Gascony
 Lupus III Centule of Gascony (died c. 820), Duke of Gascony 818-819
 Lupus Servatus (c. 805 – c. 862), French abbot, theological writer and member of Charles the Bald's court

Family name
 Peter Lupus (born 1932), American bodybuilder and actor
 Christian Lupus (1612 – 1681), Flemish theologist and historian

Fictional
 Anthony Lupus  character in DC Comics
 Cain Lupus character from manhwa Yours to Claim

See also

 Giovanni Luppis (1813-1875), Austrian naval officer and the first to conceive of the self-propelled torpedo
 Lupus (disambiguation)